Józefa Czerniawska-Pęksa (born 31 January 1937) is a Polish cross-country skier. She competed at the 1956, 1960 and the 1968 Winter Olympics.

Cross-country skiing results

Olympic Games

World Championships

References

External links
 

1937 births
Living people
Polish female cross-country skiers
Olympic cross-country skiers of Poland
Cross-country skiers at the 1956 Winter Olympics
Cross-country skiers at the 1960 Winter Olympics
Cross-country skiers at the 1968 Winter Olympics
Sportspeople from Zakopane